Mimopsestis is a monotypic moth genus belonging to the subfamily Thyatirinae of the Drepanidae. It was described by Shōnen Matsumura in 1921. Its single species, Mimopsestis basalis, was described by Wileman in 1911. It is found in Japan and the Chinese provinces of Henan, Shaanxi, Hubei and Hunan.

The wingspan is about 50 mm. The forewings are whitish grey, tinged with fuscous on the outer third. The basal area, limited by a black obtusely angled line, is brownish and darker on the costal portion. There are some long black scales on the median nervule and the stigmata are represented by tufts of white scales, with some black scales at the lower end of the reniform. The postmedial line is black, wavy and excurved to vein 2, thence straight to the inner margin. This line is most distinct on the costa, and is followed by a wavy pale-edged dusky line. The antemarginal line is whitish and wavy. The hindwings are whitish grey suffused with fuscous. The median line is blackish, double and indistinct.

Subspecies
Mimopsestis basalis basalis (Japan)
Mimopsestis basalis sinensis Laszlo, G. Ronkay, L. Ronkay & Witt, 2007 (China: Henan, Shaanxi, Hubei, Hunan)

Former species
 Mimopsestis albogrisea Mell, 1942
 Mimopsestis circumdata Houlbert, 1921
 Mimopsestis curvata Sick, 1941
 Mimopsestis determinata Bryk, 1943
 Mimopsestis flammifera Houlbert, 1921
 Mimopsestis hoenei Sick, 1941
 Mimopsestis minor Sick, 1941
 Mimopsestis pseudomaculata Houlbert, 1921

References

  (1921) Thousand Insects of Japan (Additam.). 4: 854, 855.
  (2007) Esperiana Buchreihe zur Entomologie. Band 13: 1–683.
  (1987) "Notes on Mimopsestis Matsumura, 1921, and its Allied New Genus, with Descriptions of Three New Species from Southeast Asia (Lepidoptera, Thyatiridae)". Tyô to Ga. 38 (1): 39–53.

Thyatirinae
Drepanidae genera
Moths described in 1911
Monotypic moth genera